Estimated list of the equipment of the Russian Ground Forces in service as of 2022. Note that due to the ongoing Russian invasion of Ukraine quantities of operational equipment are highly uncertain. Also note that this list does not include information on Ukrainian equipment captured by Russian forces during the 2022 Russian invasion of Ukraine. Following the integration of the First Donetsk Army Corps and Second Guards Lugansk-Severodonetsk Army Corps into the Russian Ground Forces, equipment used by these groups are additionally included.

Small arms

Artillery

Vehicles

Unmanned vehicles

Individual equipment

Future equipment

Future vehicles

Notes

References
 GlobalSecurity
 Warfare.be Russian Military Analysis (Archived 18 May 2016)
 Russian Army Military equipment and vehicles of Russia on armyrecognition.com
 ЦАМТО / Новости / Валерий Герасимов: за пятилетний период принято на вооружение более 300 новых образцов ВиВТ

 
Russian Ground Forces
Russian and Soviet military-related lists